The Mexican National Middleweight Championship is a professional wrestling championship controlled by the  (Mexico City Boxing and Wrestling Commission). The championship was created in 1933 and was promoted regularly until December 8, 2008. (EMLL) had control of the championship from its creation until 1992, at which point it was transferred to Lucha Libre AAA Worldwide (AAA). The championship's history between 1933 and 1937 is only partially known; for some periods it is unclear who held the championship. The first champion was Yaqui Joe; records of the identity of his opponent for the championship are unclear. In early 2009, AAA stopped promoting all Mexican National Championships, opting to focus on its AAA-branded championships instead. In 2021, the championship was reactivated by Consejo Mundial de Lucha Libre, with Templario defeating Dragón Rojo Jr. to win the vacant title.

There have been at least 63 championship reigns, and 38 wrestlers have held the championship. El Santo and Octagón both held it four times, the most for any wrestler. The longest confirmed reign belongs to El Santo. His third reign lasted 1,758 days from May 31, 1956, to March 24, 1961. The shortest reign lasted 11 days; Perro Aguayo held it from February 28 to March 11, 1977. As with all professional wrestling championships, matches for the Mexican National Tag Team Championship were not won or lost competitively but by a pre-planned ending to the match, the outcome of which was determined by the CMLL bookers and match makers. Occasionally, organizers of a promotion declared the championship vacant, which meant there was no champion for a period. This was either due to a storyline, or real-life problems such as an injured champion being unable to defend the championship or they had left the company. All title matches took place under two out of three falls rules.

Title history

List of championship reigns by combined length
Championships without a specific start or end date are not included as it is not possible to calculate the specific number of dates for a reign.

Championship tournaments

1977
Perro Aguayo won the NWA World Middleweight Championship on March 11, 1977, while being the reigning Mexican National Middleweight Champion. As a result, Aguayo relinquished the Mexican National title so that the EMLL could hold an eight-man tournament to determine the next champion. The first round was held on March 25, the semi-finals on April 8 and the tournament's finals on April 15. In the finals, Jose Luis Mendieta defeated Rubí Ruvalcaba to win the championship.

2005–2006
The tournament ran from October 14, 2005 – January 9, 2006. Records are unclear as to who Histeria and Psicosis II defeated to qualify for the semi-finals.

Footnotes

References

Lucha Libre AAA Worldwide championships
Consejo Mundial de Lucha Libre championships
Mexican national wrestling championships
Middleweight wrestling championships
National professional wrestling championships